Francisco Mora (born 26 August 1996) is a Portuguese racing driver currently competing in the Campeonato de Portugal de Velocidade with a Cupra Leon TCR with technical assistance from Veloso Motorsport. He previously competed in the Italian GT, TCR International and Blancpain Sprint Series.

Racing career
Mora began his career in 2011 in karting. He switched to the Formula Renault 2.0 Alps in 2013, he ended 14th in the Junior standings. In 2014 Mora switched to the Italian GT. In May 2015, it was announced that Mora would make his TCR International Series debut with Veloso Motorsport driving a SEAT León Cup Racer.

Racing record

Complete TCR International Series results
(key) (Races in bold indicate pole position) (Races in italics indicate fastest lap)

Complete TCR Europe Series results
(key) (Races in bold indicate pole position) (Races in italics indicate fastest lap)

† Driver did not finish, but was classified as he completed over 75% of the race distance.

References

External links
 

1996 births
Living people
Portuguese racing drivers
Formula Renault Eurocup drivers
Formula Renault 2.0 Alps drivers
TCR International Series drivers
Sportspeople from Porto
TCR Europe Touring Car Series drivers